The Environmental Audit Select Committee is a select committee of the House of Commons in the Parliament of the United Kingdom. The remit of the committee is to examine how government departments' policies and programmes will affect both the environment and sustainable development.

Current membership
As of 6 October 2022, these are the members of the Environmental Audit Select Committee:

Membership 2017–2019 
In the 57th parliament the following MPs sat on the committee:

Changes
Occasionally, the House of Commons orders changes to be made in terms of membership of select committees, as proposed by the Committee of Selection. Such changes are shown below.

See also
List of Committees of the United Kingdom Parliament

References

External links
Records for this Committee are held at the Parliamentary Archives
Environmental Audit Select Committee home page

Select Committees of the British House of Commons